Telma Alexandra Pinto Monteiro ComM (born 27 December 1985) is a Portuguese judoka who has won multiple medals in international competitions, such as the European and World Championships.
She is a two times winner of the Paris Grand Slam, in 2012 and 2015.

At the 2016 Summer Olympics in Rio de Janeiro, she won her first-ever Olympic medal after taking the bronze in the women's –57 kg event. She also competed in the women's 57 kg event at the 2020 Summer Olympics held in Tokyo, Japan.

Born in Lisbon, she represented Construções Norte/Sul until 2007, when she joined S.L. Benfica.

Achievements

–57 kg

2019
 Bronze – Masters Abu Dhabi
 Bronze – European Games / European Championships (Minsk)

2018
 Gold – Grand Slam Ekaterinburg

2017
 Gold – European Open (Minsk)

2016
 Bronze – Olympic Games (Rio de Janeiro)
 Bronze – Grand Prix (Budapest)

2015
 Gold – European Championships
 Gold – Grand Slam Paris

2014
 Silver – World Championships
 Gold – Grand Slam (Abu Dhabi)
 Silver – Grand Slam Tokyo

2013
 Bronze – European Championships (Budapest)
 Gold – European Open (Sofia)

2012
 17th – Olympic Games
 Gold – European Championships
 Gold – Grand Slam Paris
 Silver – Masters (Almaty)

2011
 Silver – European Championships
 Gold – European Cup (Hamburg)
 Bronze – World Cup (Lisbon)
 Bronze – Grand Slam Paris
 Bronze – Grand Prix (Abu Dhabi)
 Gold – Masters (Baku)

2010
 Silver – World Championships
 Bronze – European Championships
 Gold – World Cup (Sofia)
 Silver – Grand Prix Düsseldorf
 Silver – Grand Slam Rio de Janeiro
 Bronze – Grand Slam Moscow

2009
 Gold – European Championships
 Silver – World Championships
 Gold – World Cup (Lisbon)
 Gold – World Cup (Sofia)
 Gold – Grand Prix (Hamburg)
 Gold – Grand Slam Rio de Janeiro
 Bronze – Grand Slam Moscow

–52 kg

2008
 9th – Olympic Games
 Gold – Portuguese Cup by teams
 Gold – World Cup (Bucharest) A category
 Bronze – World Cup (Paris) Super A category

2007
 Silver – World Championships
 Gold – European Championships
 Gold – World Cup (Lisbon)
 Gold – World Cup (Denmark)
 Silver – Super A Tournament (Paris)
 Silver – Super A Tournament (Moscow)

2006
1st – World Ranking –52 kg
 Gold – European Championships
 Gold – World Cup (Lisbon)
 Silver – Fukuoka International Championships (Fukuoka)
 Gold – Super A Tournament (Moscow)
 Gold – Under-23 European Championships (Moscow)

2005
 Bronze – World Championships
 Bronze – European Championships
 Gold – World Cup (Madrid)
 Bronze – World Cup (Tampere)
 Silver – Under-23 European Championships (Kyiv)
 Gold – Kiyoshi Kobayashi International Championship
 Gold – World Cup (Bucharest)

2004
2nd – European Ranking –52 kg
 12th – Olympic Games
 Silver – Juniors World Championship (Budapest)
 Gold – Junior European Championship (Sofia)
 Gold – European Open (Germany)
 Gold – World Cup (Leonding)
 Gold – World Cup (Rome)
 Bronze – World Cup (Tallinn)
 Bronze – World Cup (Warsaw)

2003
 Gold – Portuguese Championship
 Bronze – Juniors European Championships (Sarajevo)
 Gold – Juniors A Championship (Sweden)
 Gold – Juniors A Championship (Hungary)
 Gold – Juniors A Championship (Portugal)
 Bronze – Juniors A Championship (Czech Republic)

2002
 9th – Juniors European Championship
 Gold – Juniors Portuguese Championship
 Silver – Portugal Juniors A Tournament

2001
 Silver – Esperanças Portuguese Championship

Orders
 Officer of the Order of Merit
 Commander of the Order of Merit

References

Further reading

External links
 
 

1985 births
Living people
Sportspeople from Lisbon
Portuguese female judoka
Judoka at the 2004 Summer Olympics
Judoka at the 2008 Summer Olympics
Judoka at the 2012 Summer Olympics
Judoka at the 2016 Summer Olympics
Judoka at the 2020 Summer Olympics
Olympic judoka of Portugal
European Games medalists in judo
European Games gold medalists for Portugal
Judoka at the 2015 European Games
Olympic bronze medalists for Portugal
Olympic medalists in judo
Medalists at the 2016 Summer Olympics
S.L. Benfica (martial arts)
Judoka at the 2019 European Games
European Games bronze medalists for Portugal
European Games silver medalists for Portugal
Golden Globes (Portugal) winners
21st-century Portuguese women